The Cross of Peñalba is a 10th-century votive cross given by Ramiro II of Leon to Genadio of Astorga, abbot of the monastery of Santiago de Peñalba, in gratitude for the assistance of St James in the Battle of Simancas in 939 against Abd-ar-Rahman III.

Bibliography
García Gómez, Emilio (1950). Una Crónica anónima de Abd al-Rahman III al-Nasir. Consejo Superior de Investigaciones Científicas. 
Sánchez-Albornoz, Claudio (1969). León y su historia: miscelánea histórica. Tomo I. Centro de Estudios e Investigación San Isidoro/Patronato José María Cuadrado. 
Grau Lobo, Luis A. (1993). Cruz votiva de Santiago de Peñalba. Instituto de Estudios Bercianos/Museo de León.
Rodríguez Fernández, Justiniano (1998). Ramiro II, rey de León. La Olmeda. 
Menéndez Pidal, Marcelino (2011). Historia de España. El Buey Mudo.

References

10th-century sculptures
Penalba